Ölgii Airport   is a public airport located in Ölgii, the capital of Bayan-Ölgii Province in Mongolia.

Airlines and destinations

See also 
 List of airports in Mongolia

References

External links 
 world airport codes Ölgii

Airports in Mongolia